East Kikori Rural LLG is a local-level government (LLG) of Gulf Province, Papua New Guinea.

Wards
01. Negebare
02. Tobare
03. Sera
04. Omo
05. Kabarau
06. Irimuku
07. Morere
08. Ero
09. Veraibari
10. Kivaumai
11. Morovamu
12. Wowoubo
13. Waitari
14. Nahoromere
15. Era Maipua

References

Local-level governments of Gulf Province